Entomopteryx is a genus of moths in the family Geometridae erected by Achille Guenée in 1857.

Species
 Entomopteryx amputata Guenée, 1857
 Entomopteryx combusta (Warren, 1893)
 Entomopteryx deminuta (Warren, 1894)
 Entomopteryx statheuta (Prout, 1932)

References

Geometridae